Joshua Metellus (born January 21, 1998) is an American football strong safety for the Minnesota Vikings of the National Football League (NFL). He played college football at Michigan.

College career

After playing at Charles W. Flanagan High School, Metellus committed to Michigan on June 17, 2015, choosing the Wolverines over Colorado, Florida International, Middle Tennessee State and others. He had previously committed to Georgia Southern, but switched to Michigan after attending an affiliate camp, and Flanagan teammate Devin Bush Jr. later signed with Michigan as well.

Metellus saw some action as a backup during his true freshman season at Michigan, and garnered honorable mention all-Big Ten during his sophomore season on the strength of three games started.

After practicing at both free safety and strong safety in spring, his senior season included duties as an edge cover in the running game and a roaming safety in the passing game. Metellus was named a team captain his senior season, and participated in the 2020 Senior Bowl and 2020 NFL Combine.

Professional career

Metellus was drafted by the Minnesota Vikings in the sixth round (205th overall) of the 2020 NFL Draft. He was waived by the Vikings during final roster cuts on September 5, 2020 and signed to the practice squad the next day. He was promoted to the active roster on September 18, 2020.

Metellus made his first career start in Week 3 of the 2022 season against the Detroit Lions, where he recorded his first career interception off Jared Goff in the final seconds of the fourth quarter in the 28-24 win.

References

External links
Minnesota Vikings bio
Michigan Wolverines bio

1998 births
Living people
Players of American football from Florida
Sportspeople from Pembroke Pines, Florida
American football safeties
Michigan Wolverines football players
Minnesota Vikings players